Alexandria Opera House or Sayed Darwish Theatre was built in 1918 and opened in 1921 in the city of Alexandria, Egypt. When it opened, it was named Teatro Mohamed Ali.

Sources
 Alexandria Opera House "Sayed Darwish Theatre" on cairoopera.org
 Alexandria Opera House "Sayed Darwish Theatre" on Facebook

Opera houses in Egypt
Theatres completed in 1918
Music venues completed in 1918
20th-century architecture in Egypt